Kevin Chan is the Chair of Pediatrics at Memorial University of Newfoundland and Clinical Chief of Children's Health at the Janeway Children's Health and Rehabilitation Centre in St. John's, Newfoundland where he also works as an emergency physician. He previously worked as an emergency physician at The Hospital for Sick Children in Toronto, Ontario.

He received a Bachelor of Science B.Sc. (Hon.) from the University of Toronto, an MD from the University of Ottawa, and an MPH From Harvard University.

In 1994, Dr. Chan co-founded the Student University Network for Social and International Health or Reseau Etudiants Universitaire Pour la Sociale et Sante Internationale. He also helped found the Centre for International Health and Development at the University of Ottawa and the Centre for International Health at the University of British Columbia.

In 2001-2002, he was co-chair of the Canadian Society for International Health, and between 2001-2003 he was President of the International Child Health Section of the Canadian Paediatric Society.  He was the recipient of the Chris Krogh award Prize from the Global Health Education Consortium (now Consortium of University for Global Health).
He is currently the president of the Emergency Medicine Section of the Canadian Pediatric Society, an executive member of the Section on International Child Health of the American Academy of Pediatrics.

He is the winner of the Frank Knox Memorial Fellowship from Harvard University in 2002.  In 2003, he won the Yale Johnson & Johnson Physician Scholarship in International Health.  He has also been a recipient of the Pierre Elliott Trudeau Scholarship.

Chan has worked extensively in Malawi, Uganda, Tanzania and Zimbabwe, as well as in complex humanitarian emergency situations in Rwanda and Kosovo. He is a co-founder of KidECare, a pediatric urgent care clinic in Toronto.

Kevin is the brother of Arnold Chan.

References

1972 births
Living people
Canadian humanitarians
Canadian hospital administrators
Harvard School of Public Health alumni
People from Toronto
University of Ottawa alumni
University of Toronto alumni
Canadian emergency physicians